The 1979 African Championships in Athletics were held in the Stade Iba Mar Diop in Dakar, Senegal, between 2 and 5 August. There were a total number of 251 competitors from 24 countries, with 23 men's and 16 women's events.

Medal summary

Men's events

Women's events

Medal table

References

External links 
Results – GBR Athletics

A
African Championships in Athletics
A
African Championships In Athletics, 1979
African Championships in Athletics
African Championships in Athletics, 1979
African Championships in Athletics
Sports competitions in Dakar
Athletics competitions in Senegal